HMS Rainbow was a  submarine built for the Royal Navy during the 1930s.

Design and description
The Rainbow-class submarines were designed as improved versions of the Parthian class and were intended for long-range operations in the Far East. They displaced  on the surface and  submerged. The Rainbow-class submarines had a crew of 56 officers and ratings.

For surface running, the boats were powered by two  diesel engines, each driving one propeller shaft. When submerged each propeller was driven by a  electric motor. They could reach  on the surface and  underwater.

The boats were armed with six  torpedo tubes in the bow and two more in the stern. They carried six reload torpedoes for a grand total of fourteen torpedoes. They were also armed with a QF 4.7-inch (120 mm) Mark IX deck gun.

Construction and career
Rainbow ran aground in the English Channel off Ventnor, Isle of Wight, on 22 January 1932. She was refloated later the same day.

Rainbow served in the Far East until 1940, when she moved to the Mediterranean. She left for a patrol off Calabria on 23 September 1940
 and was due to be back in Alexandria on 16 October, she was last heard from on 25 September. She is believed to have been sunk on 4 October in a collision with the Italian merchant ship Antonietta Costa, which reported striking a submerged object at 03:30, followed by a huge underwater explosion while sailing in convoy from Albania on that date.

Notes

References

External links
 Chatham-built submarines: HM Submarine Rainbow 
 HMS Rainbow at the Barrow Submariners Association

 

Rainbow-class submarines
Ships built in Chatham
1930 ships
Maritime incidents in 1932
World War II submarines of the United Kingdom
Maritime incidents in October 1940
World War II shipwrecks in the Mediterranean Sea
Warships lost in combat with all hands
Submarines sunk in collisions
Lost submarines of the United Kingdom
Submarines sunk by Italian warships